Edward Short (June 10, 1806 – June 5, 1871) was a lawyer, judge and political figure in Quebec.

He was born in Bristol, England in 1806, the son of John Quirk Short and the grandson of Robert Quirk Short, and came to Canada with his family. He studied law in Trois-Rivières and was called to the Bar of Quebec in 1826. He had practices in Montreal, Trois-Rivières and Quebec City, where he was a partner of Thomas Cushing Aylwin. He settled in Sherbrooke in 1830. In 1839, Short married Ann Brown. He was appointed to the Court of the Sessions of the Peace in Saint-François district.

He was elected to the 4th Parliament of the Province of Canada representing the town of Sherbrooke in 1851. In November 1852, he was appointed a justice of the Quebec Superior Court, Saint-François district, and became a judge in the Seigneurial Court in 1854.

He died in Sherbrooke in 1871.

Short Street in Sherbrooke was named after him.

External links 
 

1806 births
1871 deaths
Canadian judges
Members of the Legislative Assembly of the Province of Canada from Canada East
English emigrants to pre-Confederation Quebec
Province of Canada judges
Immigrants to Lower Canada
19th-century Canadian judges